Thulcandra is a black metal band from Munich, Germany.  They have released four full-length studio albums. Their latest album A Dying Wish was released in 2021 through Napalm Records to overwhelming reviews. The band's style is described as melodic black metal and inspired by bands such as Dissection, Sacramentum, and Unanimated.

History

Forming
Thulcandra was founded in 2003 by guitarist Steffen Kummerer and Jurgen Zintz. Thulcandra recorded a demo called Perishness Around Us in 2004, but neither were satisfied with its quality and did not release it. Shortly thereafter guitarist Jürgen Zintz committed suicide in 2005. Thus the band then went on hold. Upon moving to another city in late 2008 Steffen Kummerer started listening to their first demo after many years, and decided to restart the band.

The name of the band is taken from a 1989 demo of the Norwegian act Darkthrone, coming from the 1938 science fiction novel Out of the Silent Planet by C. S. Lewis, where Thulcandra is the name for the silent planet, Earth.

Members

Current members
Steffen Kummerer - guitars & vocals (2002–present)
Alessandro Delastik - drums (2014–present)
Mariano Delastik - guitars (2018–present)
Carsten Schorn - bass (2020–present)

Former members
Jürgen Zintz - guitars (2003–2005; died 2005)
Jonas Baumgartl - drums (2003–2005)
Seraph - drums (2008–2015)
Sebastian Ludwig - guitars (2008–2017)
Tobias Ludwig - bass (2008–2017)
Christian Kratzer - bass (2018–2020, died in 2020)

Discography

Studio albums
 Fallen Angel’s Dominion (2010)
 Under a Frozen Sun (2011)
 Ascension Lost (2015)
 A Dying Wish (2021)
 Hail the Abyss (2023)

Demo
 Perishness Around Us (2004)

EPs 
 The Great Shadow (2021)

Music videos
 The Second Fall (2015)
Funeral Pyre (2021)
Nocturnal Heresy (2021)
A Dying Wish (2021)

References

External links
 
 

German black metal musical groups
Napalm Records artists
Musical groups established in 2003
2003 establishments in Germany